This is a list of electoral results for the Electoral district of Frankston East in Victorian state elections.

Members for Frankston East

Election results

Elections in the 1990s

References

Victoria (Australia) state electoral results by district